Akto Town is a town and the county seat of Akto County in Xinjiang Uygur Autonomous Region, China. Located in the northeast of the county, the town covers an area of 136 square kilometers with a population of 21,560 (as of 2017). It has 19 communities and 9 villages under its jurisdiction, its seat is at Gongbaitierik.

Name
The name of Akto is from Kyrgyz language, meaning  “White Mountain” and named after the oasis located under a snowy mountain.

Geography
The town of Akto is located in the middle of the alluvial fan of the Kushan River and its terrain is slowly inclined from the southwest to the northeast. The town is bordered by Pilal Township with the Baishikan Channel to the north, by Yumai Township to  the southeast and by Baren Township with the Qiereke Channel to the west. Its maximum length is 11 kilometers west to east, the maximum length is 16 kilometers north to south, the total area is 136 square kilometers and the arable land area is 1,618.44 hectares. The town has an average elevation of 1,300 to 1,400 meters. It is a typical temperate continental arid climate with four distinct seasons, dry and less rain, with an average annual temperature of 11.2 °C and a frost-free period of 221 days. Farmland is distributed near urban areas.

Administrative divisions
The town has 19 communities and 9 villages under its jurisdiction.

19 communities
 Baishanlu Community
 Beijingbeilu Community
 Beijingnanlu Community
 Binghudong Community
 Binghuxi Community
 Gonggerlu Community
 Guangminglu Community
 Hexielu Community
 Kunlunlu Community
 Laocheng Community
 Letaoyuan Community
 Mushitagelu Community
 Pami'erlu Community
 Renminlu Community
 Tuanjielu Community
 Wenhualu Community
 Xingfudonglu Community
 Xingfulu Community
 Youyilu Community

9 administration villages
 Aodaerik Village
 Barinerik Village
 Gongbaitierik Village
 Kayiqaerik Village
 Nokuqierik Village
 Qikerterek Village
 Yagiqak Village
 Yangqimahala Village
 Yingqikaierik Village

 Unincorporated villages  
 Ayagmahalla
 Aydingkol

References 

Township-level divisions of Akto County
County seats in Xinjiang